John Cadbury (12 August 1801 – 11 May 1889) was a Quaker and English proprietor, tea and coffee trader and founder of Cadbury, the chocolate business based in Birmingham, England.

Life  
John Cadbury was born in Birmingham on 12 August 1801 to Richard Tapper Cadbury and his wife Elizabeth Head. He was from a wealthy Quaker family that moved to the area from the west of England. John went to school at Joseph Crosfields Quaker School at Hartshill, Warwickshire. As a Quaker in the early 19th century, he was not allowed to enter a university, so could not pursue a profession such as medicine or law.

Founding Cadbury
As Quakers are historically and typically pacifist, a military career was also out of the question. So, like many other Quakers of the time, he turned his energies toward business. After being apprenticed to a tea dealer in Leeds in 1818, he opened a grocer's shop at 93 Bull Street, Birmingham in 1824. He prepared drinking chocolate, and eventually decided to start commercial manufacture, opening a warehouse in Crooked Lane. In 1842, he was selling 16 lines of drinking chocolate, and eleven lines of cocoa. In 1846 he entered into a partnership with his brother Benjamin, establishing Cadbury Brothers, which moved to a new factory in Bridge Street in 1847. In 1850, the Cadbury brothers pulled out of the retail business, which was passed to John's son, Richard Barrow Cadbury (Barrow's remained a leading Birmingham store until the 1960s). The partnership was dissolved by mutual consent in 1856 and John retired in 1861, following the death of his wife. Control of the manufacturing business passed to his sons Richard and George.

John Cadbury also campaigned against animal cruelty, forming the Animals Friend Society, a forerunner of the Royal Society for the Prevention of Cruelty to Animals.

Cadbury married twice. He married Priscilla Ann Dymond (1799–1828), in 1826, but she died two years later. In Lancaster on 24 July 1832 he married his second wife, Candia Barrow (Lancaster, 8 April 1805 – 5 March 1855), daughter of George Barrow and wife Elizabeth Pumphrey, and had seven children: John (1834–1866), Richard (1835–1899), Maria (1838–1908), George (1839–1922), Joseph (1841–1841), Edward (1843–1866), and Henry (1845–1875).

Richard and George relocated the business in 1879 to an area of what was then north Worcestershire, on the borders of the parishes of Northfield and King's Norton centred on the Georgian-built Bournbrook Hall, where they developed the garden village of Bournville; now a major suburb of Birmingham.

The family developed the Cadbury's factory, which remains the main UK manufacturing site of the business. The district around the factory has been dry for over 100 years, with no alcohol being sold in pubs, bars or shops. Residents have fought to maintain this, winning a court battle in March 2007 with Britain's biggest supermarket chain Tesco, to prevent it selling alcohol in its local outlet.

References

 Randall Morck, A History of Corporate Governance around the World: Family Business Groups – Page 600, University of Chicago Press, 2006,

External links 

Cadbury
1802 births
1889 deaths
English Quakers
History of chocolate
People of the Industrial Revolution